For the Summer Olympics, there were a total of 45 venues that started with the letter 'L'.

References

 List L